Calophyllum insularum is a species of flowering plant in the Calophyllaceae family. It is found only in West Papua in Indonesia. It is threatened by habitat loss.

References

insularum
Flora of Western New Guinea
Endangered plants
Taxonomy articles created by Polbot